Puszcza Zielonka Landscape Park is a protected area (Landscape Park) situated to the north-east of the city of Poznań in Greater Poland Voivodeship, Poland. It is made up of parts of the gminas (administrative districts) of Czerwonak, Kiszkowo, Murowana Goślina, Pobiedziska and Skoki. It consists mainly of the Puszcza Zielonka forest (80% of the area of the landscape park is forest). It includes five nature reserves, several lakes, and villages including Zielonka, Kamińsko, Dąbrówka Kościelna, Głęboczek, Łopuchówko and Tuczno. At the top of this hill there is an observation tower, used especially for observing possible fires in the surrounding forest, but also seasonally opened to the public as a viewing tower.

References

 Arkadiusz Bednarek, Wooden Churches Trail (Szlak kościołów drewnianych). 

Landscape parks in Poland
Tourist attractions in Greater Poland Voivodeship
Poznań County